Per-Olov Danielsson (born 31 October 1968) is a Swedish modern pentathlete. He competed at the 1992 and 1996 Summer Olympics.

References

External links
 

1968 births
Living people
Swedish male modern pentathletes
Olympic modern pentathletes of Sweden
Modern pentathletes at the 1992 Summer Olympics
Modern pentathletes at the 1996 Summer Olympics
People from Falkenberg
Sportspeople from Halland County